Marble Falls is a city in Burnet County, Texas, United States.  As of the 2020 United States Census, the city population was 7,033. 
Lake Marble Falls is part of the Highland Lakes on the Colorado River, the largest chain of lakes in Texas. Marble Falls was founded by Adam Rankin Johnson in 1887, a former Indian fighter and Confederate general.

History

Marble Falls was founded in 1887 by Adam Rankin "Stovepipe" Johnson, a former Indian fighter and Confederate general. Johnson had visited the natural marble falls during his pre-war days as a Burnet County surveyor, and wanted to build an industrial city powered by the Colorado River. Johnson facilitated the construction of a railroad to nearby Granite Mountain in 1884, and helped plat the Marble Falls townsite. The sale of lots began in 1887, and Johnson built a home, a college, and a factory near the falls. The town grew to a population of 1,800 within ten years.

In 1917, Marble Falls elected Ophelia Crosby "Birdie" Harwood as the first woman mayor in Texas, three years before women were allowed to vote.

When the Max Starcke Dam was completed in 1951, the marble falls which had given the town its name were submerged under the new Lake Marble Falls. The town's economy declined through the drought of the 1950s, and prospered as a tourism and retirement location, beginning in the 1970s. Beginning in the 1980s, Marble Falls has grown into the retail and entertainment center for the Highland Lakes area.

Geography

Marble Falls is located on the banks of Lake Marble Falls. According to the Handbook of Texas website, the former falls were flooded by the lake, which was created by a shelf of limestone running diagonally across the Colorado River from northeast to southwest. The upper layer of limestone, brownish on the exterior but a deep blue inside, was so hard and cherty it was mistaken for marble. The natural lake and waterfall were covered when the Colorado River was dammed with the completion of Max Starcke Dam in 1951. A photo of the falls as they once existed can be seen at the website for the Wallace Guest House, a local bed and breakfast. Lake Marble Falls sits between Lake Lyndon B. Johnson to the north and Lake Travis to the south. The falls for which the city is named are now underwater but are revealed every few years when the lake is lowered.

Equally noteworthy is the huge igneous batholith called Granite Mountain looming on the town's western edge that secured Marble Falls' place in Texas history. The famed pink granite was used for the construction of the Texas State Capitol and other state government office buildings, and can also be found in the Galveston Seawall and Austin–Bergstrom International Airport.

Demographics

2020 census

As of the 2020 United States census, there were 7,037 people, 2,789 households, and 1,664 families residing in the city.

2010 census
As of the census of 2010, there were 6,077 people, 2,486 households, and 1,542 families residing in the city.  There were 28,235 housing units. The racial makeup of the city was 83.1% White, 3.9% African American, 0.7% Native American, 0.8% Asian, 9.1% from other races, and 2.4% from two or more races. Hispanic or Latino of any race were 24.2% of the population.

There were 2,486 households, out of which 29.8% had children under the age of 18 living with them, 42% were married couples living together, 14.6% had a female householder with no husband present, and 38% were non-families. The average household size was 2.41 and the average family size was 3.08.

Marble Falls, as of December 1, 2009, is the anchor of the Marble Falls, TX Micropolitan Statistical Area. The census bureau has defined this area as including all of Burnet County and has a total population of 42,896. The micropolitan area, due to close ties to nearby Austin, is a component of the Austin-Round Rock-Marble Falls, TX Consolidated Statistical Area.

Education

Marble Falls Independent School District operates public schools, including Marble Falls High School.

Post-secondary institutions
 Texas Tech University at Highland Lakes
 Central Texas College – Marble Falls

Notable people

 J. Frank Dobie (1888–1964), folklorist, writer, and newspaper columnist owned a ranch in Marble Falls
 Gerald Lyda (1923–2005), general contractor and cattle rancher, born and raised in Marble Falls
 Leonel Manzano, silver medal winner in the 1500m at the 2012 London Olympics, NCAA 1500m Champion, member of the USA 2008 Beijing Olympic Team and the USA 2012 London Olympic Team
 John Arthur Martinez, second-place winner on USA Network's Nashville Star, taught English and tennis at Marble Falls High School
 David Morgan, Tight end for the Minnesota Vikings

References

External links

 City of Marble Falls official website
 
 Marble Falls/Lake LBJ Chamber of Commerce
 Granite Mountain article

Cities in Texas
Cities in Burnet County, Texas
Populated places established in 1887
1887 establishments in Texas